Stare Brynki  (German: Brünken) is a village in the administrative district of Gmina Gryfino, within Gryfino County, West Pomeranian Voivodeship, in north-western Poland, close to the German border.

See also

 History of Pomerania

References

Stare Brynki